Ilya Yakovlevich Kaplan (born 27 June 1986) is a former Russian professional football player.

Club career
He played one season in the Russian Football National League for FC Arsenal Tula in 2004.

External links
 
 Career summary by sportbox.ru

1982 births
Living people
Russian footballers
Russian expatriate footballers
Expatriate footballers in Latvia
Russian expatriate sportspeople in Latvia
FC Arsenal Tula players
FC Khimik-Arsenal players
Association football midfielders
Latvian Higher League players